Stephen Hagan (born 1959) is an Australian author and anti-racism campaigner. He is also a newspaper editor, documentary maker, university lecturer and former diplomat.

Early life and education
Hagan was born in 1959 in Cunnamulla in South West Queensland, Australia. His father, Jim Hagan, belonged to the Kullili people of the region, while his mother was from the nearby Kooma. Hagan spent his first seven years living on a camp on the outskirts of the town, before moving into a new house nearby; an experience that helped shape his perceptions of the socio-economic inequalities between the aboriginal population and white Australians.

Success in high school led to an opportunity to attend boarding school at Marist College Ashgrove in Brisbane. From there he undertook training to become a teacher, but he reports that he became disillusioned with the system after being required to teach with "racist" texts.

Career
After he left teaching to work with a number of Indigenous organisations, and through them he met and worked under Aboriginal activist Charles Perkins. From there he moved into the Department of Foreign Affairs, gaining a diplomatic post to Colombo in Sri Lanka. 

Upon returning to Australia he worked in both the public and private sectors, the latter including venturing into cultural tourism. More recently he lectured at the University of Southern Queensland (USQ) in Toowoomba while undertaking a doctorate.

In July 2010, Hagan became editor of the National Indigenous Times.  After promising to fix problems with plagiarism at the paper, Hagan left in December 2013. His suit for unfair dismissal was part of the reason the paper went into administration in 2015.

Hagan was awarded a doctorate by USQ in 2016 for a thesis on judicial bias against Indigenous Australians. The thesis was the base for his 2017 book, The Rise and Rise of Judicial Bigotry.

In 2021, Hagan was appointed chief executive of the Townsville Aboriginal and Islander Health Services (TAIHS). His three-year contract was terminated after five months following a unanimous vote by the organisation's board. He subsequently launched an unfair dismissal case against TAIHS.

Campaigns and incidents

E. S. "Nigger" Brown Stand
In 1999, Hagan visited the Clive Berghofer Stadium in Toowoomba, Queensland, and noticed a large sign declaring the name of the E. S. "Nigger" Brown Stand, which had been named after the 1920s rugby league player Edwin Stanley Brown  – also known as "Nigger" Brown, possibly in response to his pale skin and blond hair. This prompted a long campaign to have the stand renamed to remove the offending nickname.

Hagan unsuccessfully pursued the case before the High Court and the Federal Court of Australia, both of which rejected his claim.

In 2003 Hagan v Australia was heard before the United Nations' Committee on the Elimination of all forms of Racial Discrimination (CERD).  Hagan, the complainant, claimed the naming of the stand was discriminatory against him.  The committee recommended that Australia "take the necessary measures to secure the removal of the offending term from the sign".

In 2008, the stand was demolished and the issue was resolved, and Toowoomba Sports Ground Inc agreed not to use the term in the future: indeed they had given a similar undertaking in 1999.

As the dispute went through the courts Hagan was brought close to bankruptcy and received threats, according to his wife, including letters claiming to be from the Ku Klux Klan. As a result of these threats and for the sake of his family, Hagan says, he decided to move house.

Coon cheese
In 2001, Hagan filed a complaint with the Advertising Standards Bureau after an advertisement for Coon cheese was broadcast during the Academy Awards. In 2008 he stated his belief that the cheese was named after a racial epithet and called on its manufacturer to prove its claim that it was named after American cheesemaker Edward Coon. This followed an earlier unsuccessful complaint to Australian Human Rights Commission in 1999. When announced in 2020 by the brand owners, Saputo Inc., that the name would be changed in the wake of Australian participation in the 2020 Black Lives Matter protests, Hagan declared that it was "a total vindication of 20 years of campaigning." In December 2020, Hagan and Destiny Rogers from QNews published the e-book Coon: More Holes than Swiss Cheese.

In 2021, Hagan commented on Lake Macquarie's council's intention of renaming Coon Island in Swansea. The island was named after a white local coalminer, Herbert Heany, who gained that nickname because of his blackened face when coming home from the mine. The council intended to start considerations about a new name in February 2021, but Hagan insisted it ought to be renamed immediately, without consultation.

Toowoomba golliwogs
On 1 December 2016 Hagan caused controversy when he labelled Toowoomba the "most racist city in Australia" after a display of nine golliwog dolls were placed by a Terry White Chemists shop underneath a sign inviting shoppers to "Experience a White Christmas". The controversy began when Toowoomba man, author George Helon spotted the dolls placed beneath the sign and circulated a picture of it on Facebook and Twitter. The store's manager apologised and said they would not stock the dolls in the future.

Coles Express
In June 2020, it was reported that Hagan would sue Coles Express for racial discrimination following an incident at a service station in Townsville where he was asked to pre-pay for fuel. He stated that two white drivers at the same time had not been required to do so.

Carlton Football Club song
In 2021, Hagan urged the Carlton Football Club to change the tune of its club song, "We Are the Navy Blues". While admitting that the song's lyrics are not racially offensive, he objected to its melody, "Lily of Laguna", and the original and racist heritage of that melody. He said, "It took me 10 years to get the name of the stand changed and now I'm doing the same for another sporting club." The club, supported by several of its Indigenous players, said any racial connotations had been removed from the song 80 years ago and that the objectionable history of its melody was unlikely to have been known to the writers of the lyrics in 1929.

Personal life
Hagan is married to Rhonda Hagan from the Mamu tribe; they have two children.

Awards and nominations
 2005: Deadly Awards – Outstanding Achievement in Literature: Stephen Hagan: The N Word: One Man's Stand
 2006: NAIDOC Person of the Year
 2007: ATOM Award and nominated at the Inside Film Awards for Best Short Documentary: Nigger Lovers, directed by Rhonda Hagan, produced by Daryl Sparkes and Stephen Hagan

Publications

References

External links
 Book review: The N Word by Stephen Hagan by Aden Ridgeway
 Nigger Lovers a documentary short by Hagan about the E. S. "Nigger" Brown stand and the word "nigger".

1959 births
People from Cunnamulla
Australian indigenous rights activists
Australian anti-racism activists
Australian documentary filmmakers
Indigenous Australian writers
Australian columnists
Writers from Queensland
Australian diplomats
Living people
University of Southern Queensland alumni
Academic staff of the University of Southern Queensland